Valeriy Vasylyovich Horodov (born 14 February 1961) is a Russian and Ukrainian professional football coach and a former Soviet player.

Playing career
Native of the Central Black Earth Region of Russian Federation, he made his professional debut in the Soviet Second League in 1981 for FC Salyut Belgorod. Horodov is better known for his goal-tending performance in Dnipro in late 80s and early 90s, while playing in the Soviet Top League.

Coaching career
In 2009, he managed FC Naftovyk-Ukrnafta Okhtyrka.

Honours
Top awards
 Soviet Top League champion: 1988.
 Soviet Cup winner: 1989.
 USSR Federation Cup winner: 1986, 1989.
 USSR Super Cup winner: 1989.
Minor awards
 Soviet Top League runner-up: 1987, 1989.
 Soviet Top League 3rd place: 1985.
 USSR Federation Cup finalist: 1990.
 Ukrainian Premier League runner-up: 1993.
 Ukrainian Premier League 3rd place: 1992, 1999.

European club competitions
With FC Dnipro Dnipropetrovsk.

 1988–89 UEFA Cup: 1 game.
 1989–90 European Cup: 6 games.
 1990–91 UEFA Cup: 2 games.

References

External links
 

1961 births
Living people
Footballers from Voronezh
Soviet footballers
Ukrainian footballers
Russian emigrants to Ukraine
Ukrainian expatriate footballers
Expatriate footballers in Morocco
Expatriate footballers in Russia
FC Salyut Belgorod players
FC Dnipro players
FC Ural Yekaterinburg players
FC Fakel Voronezh players
FC Kryvbas Kryvyi Rih players
RS Settat players
Soviet Top League players
Ukrainian Premier League players
Russian Premier League players
Ukrainian football managers
Ukrainian Premier League managers
FC Naftovyk Okhtyrka managers
Ukrainian expatriate sportspeople in Morocco
Ukrainian expatriate sportspeople in Russia
Association football goalkeepers
FC Iskra Smolensk players